Yeates Removals is a removals and storage company founded in 1910. Yeates Removals is located in Clevedon, Somerset, England.

History
Yeates was established in 1910 and initially used horse and carts for general haulage in Clevedon and the surrounding areas. Yeates is the oldest family run removal business in the Bristol area and is currently headed by James Griffin after he took over from his father John in 2001.

To coincide with Yeates’ 100th year in business, the company began raising funds for Children's Hospice South West. By 2015, Yeates has raised in excess of £11,500 for the charity.

References

Removal companies of the United Kingdom
Companies based in Somerset
Clevedon